Arisarum vulgare, common name the friar's cowl or  larus, is an herbaceous, perennial, rhizomatous plant in the genus Arisarum belonging to the family Araceae.

Description
 Arisarum vulgare reaches on average  of height. The stems are erect and unbranched, usually mottled and grow directly from the underground rhizome. A single leaflike bract (spathe) forms a purplish-brown or olive green striped tube about 5 inches long, with an open upper part helmet or hood-shaped curved forward. It encloses a fleshy greenish clublike spike (spadix)  bent forward, protruding from the tube and bearing at the bottom minute purple violet flowers. The 20 male flowers are located above the four to six female, with sterile flowers completely missing. The flowering period extends from October through May. The sexes are united in the same individual plant. Pollination is granted by insects (entomophily). The fruits are greenish berries of about long.

Distribution
Arisarum vulgare is native to the Mediterranean Basin, from the Caucasus in the east to the southeastern Iberian Peninsula in the west, where it introgresses with Arisarum simorrhinum.

Habitat

Subspecies
The main described subspecies are the following:

 Arisarum vulgare O.Targ.Tozz. subsp.  vulgare (above described)
 Arisarum vulgare O.Targ.Tozz. subsp.  simorrhinum (Durieu) Maire & Weiller

In Arisarum vulgare subsp. simorrhinum the flower stem is much shorter than the petioles. Bract and spadix are erect. The latter is thickened at the tip.

Gallery

Synonyms

References

 Herbaro virtual
 Pignatti S. - Flora d'Italia - Edagricole – 1982 - Vol. II, pag. 629
 Tutin, T.G. et al. - Flora Europaea, second edition - 1993

External links
 Arisareae en Wikispecies.
 Flora europaea
 Biolib
 Arisarum vulgare
 Malta Plants

Aroideae
Flora of the Canary Islands
Flora of the Caucasus
Flora of Southwestern Europe
Flora of Southeastern Europe
Plants described in 1810